Dinesh Prasad also known as Dinesh Prasad Kushwaha is an Indian politician from Bihar. He was the member of the Bihar Legislative Assembly from Minapur Muzaffarpur 3 times. From 2008 to 2010 he also served as Bihar's irrigation minister.

Political career 
Dinesh Prasad started his political journey with left ideology and wins his first election as an independent candidate and after that he joined Janata Dal (United).

References 

Janata Dal (United) politicians
Year of birth missing (living people)
Living people
Bihar MLAs 2005–2010